Jéan Jacques Rossouw (born 6 April 1988) is a South African rugby union player, currently playing with Western Province Premier League club side Durbanville-Bellville. His regular position is prop.

Playing career
He also represented them at Under-18 level for the next two seasons, which led to him being included in the S.A. Schools squad in 2006.

He played for Western Province's Under-19 and Under-21 teams over the next three seasons and also played for the national team during this time - he represented the South Africa Under-19 team at the 2007 Under 19 Rugby World Championship and the South Africa Under-20 team at the inaugural IRB Junior World Championship in 2008.

He made his first class debut in the 2010 Vodacom Cup for Western Province's near neighbours  against Argentinean side .

Durbanville-Bellville
In 2015, he played for Western Province club side Durbanville-Bellville and was a member of the squad that won the 2015 SARU Community Cup competition, making seven appearances in the competition.

References

South African rugby union players
Living people
1988 births
Rugby union props
Boland Cavaliers players
Leopards (rugby union) players
SWD Eagles players
People from George, South Africa
Alumni of Paarl Gimnasium
South Africa Under-20 international rugby union players
Rugby union players from the Western Cape